Ruagea ovalis is a species of plant in the family Meliaceae. It is endemic to Bolivia.

References

Flora of Bolivia
ovalis
Vulnerable plants
Taxonomy articles created by Polbot